The Guimaras State University is a public research university in the Philippines.  It is mandated to provide undergraduate and graduate courses in technology education, agriculture, fisheries, engineering, arts and sciences, forestry, business, health, computer, criminology, nautical and short-term vocational-technical and other continuing courses.  It is also mandated to promote research, advanced studies, extension work and progressive leadership in each area of specialization.  Its main campus is located in Buenavista, Guimaras.

History
The Buenavista Vocational School, around which the Guimaras State University eventually grew, was founded under the provision of Republic Act 3933 in 1964 with Representative Rodolfo Tiamson Ganzon of the Second District of Iloilo as the leading sponsor of the bill.

The hard work of many local officials starting with Hon. Tomas Junco, who backed a resolution to persuade the legislature to establish a vocational school in Buenavista, led up to the creation of BVS when RA 3933 was passed on June 18, 1964. Representative Fermin “Nene” Zarandin Caram of the Lone District of Iloilo City made an effort for the implementation of the law. Four years later, through the efforts of lawyer Ernesto G. Gaduyon and Iloilo governor Abelardo D. Javellana, the philanthropist-lawyer Juan Z. Salvador, Jr. bestowed a 12.36-acre lot taken away from his lands in Barangay McLain, Buenavista, Guimaras, to be the school site. This significant bequest led the school to honor him by taking his name to refer to the main University grounds.

In 1980, the school was approved of offering post-secondary courses. The two-year trade technical and technology courses opened the door to the offering of higher education courses, which are either terminal or ladderized (a new system of education in the Philippines that allows learners to progress between Technical Vocational Education and Training (TVET) and college, and vice versa). In 1992, the year Guimaras was proclaimed as a regular and full-fledged province, the Sangguniang Bayan (municipal council) of Buenavista passed a resolution requesting Representative Alberto “Albertito” Javellana Lopez of the Second District of Iloilo to put his back for the conversion of BVS to Guimaras Polytechnic College.

In July 1994, Representative Lopez filed House Bill 6252, in Congress, seeking the conversion of the BVS into a polytechnic college. On March 3, 1995, President Fidel V. Ramos signed Republic Act 7944 into law, showing out the conversion of Buenavista Vocational School into Guimaras Polytechnic College, which would offer general secondary curriculum, professional, technological courses.

In June 2000, a consultation and public hearing on House Bills 7382 and 5807 sponsored by Representative Emily Relucio-Lopez of the Lone District of Guimaras was organized at the GPC Function Room. With 179 listed participants from public and private sectors in attendance, all sectoral representatives expressed full support for the conversion of GPC, Buenavista and Western Visayas College of Science and Technology (WVCST)–Guimaras Extension in the Municipality of Jordan, into a state college.

Then, in the first regular session of the Eleventh Congress, Representative Dante Ventura Liban and Representative Emily Relucio-Lopez filed House Bill 12358 (in substitution for House Bills 5807 & 7382). On June 8, 2001, President Gloria Macapagal-Arroyo signed Republic Act 9138 into law. The law established the Guimaras State College, merging the Guimaras Polytechnic College in the Municipality of Buenavista and the Western Visayas College of Science and Technology–Guimaras Extension in the Municipality of Jordan. The GSC in Buenavista was the main college grounds of the college and referred to as GSC Salvador while the one in Jordan was referred to as GSC Mosqueda Annex; [and the one in San Lorenzo was referred to as GSC Baterna Annex—an expansion during Dr. Rogelio T. Artajo's presidency].

GSU has had a mandate, from its very inception, to offer undergraduate and graduate courses in technology education, agriculture, fisheries, engineering, arts and sciences, forestry, business, health, computer, criminology, nautical and short-term vocational-technical and other continuing courses that may be found to be needed and relevant. It has promoted research, advanced studies, extension work and progressive leadership in each area of specialization ever since its beginning. Too, it has provided primary consideration through the integration of research/studies for the development of the Province of Guimaras.

For the next five decades, a principal, five administrators, an acting administrator, and an SUC president would take the helm and lead the school to its current level of excellence: Jose E. Esquera, Florencio D. Doromal, Cerilo P. Tamayo, Arthur Clemente, Mercedes R. Regalado, Teodoro B. Alenton, Hector G. Zamora, and Dr. Sofronio D. Dignomo.

Over 50 years later after its founding, the Philippine Congress approved GSC's conversion to University status by way of RA 11335, and President Rodrigo Roa Duterte signed it into law on April 26, 2019.

Today, having been the first state college in the whole Philippines to be Institutionally Accredited (IA) by Accrediting Agency for Chartered Colleges and Universities in the Philippines, the Guimaras State University awards 58 bachelor's, 8 master's, and 4 doctorate degrees—and it is going on with more degree offerings.

With a promising future, having been the first state college in the whole Philippines to be included in the group of 11 state universities and college by Commission on Higher Education (CHEd) for its Internationalization Network Program, the university is positioned to become the most student-centered university in research, teaching, and public engagement on the island, in the West Visayas, and beyond.

Annexes
The Guimaras State University has two annexes: Mosqueda Annex (in Alaguisoc, Jordan, Guimaras; Jordan is the primary gateway of logistics, investments promotion and global transshipment center of the province) and the Baterna Annex (in Constancia, San Lorenzo, Guimaras; San Lorenzo is the renewable energy, agri-fishery processing and support services center of the province).

Mosqueda Annex. By virtue of Republic Act 9138, the Western Visayas College of Science and Technology* (WVCST)-Guimaras Extension Campus in Alaguisoc, Jordan was officially turned over to the Guimaras State College during the celebration of the annual Manggahan Festival in May 2002.

The University Mosqueda Annex has an enrollment of about 864 students. It offers Master of Public Administration and Master of Education, Bachelor of Industrial Technology, Bachelor of Elementary and Secondary Education, Bachelor of Science in Business Administration, Bachelor of Science in Criminology, Bachelor of Science in Information Technology and Bachelor in Industrial Technology.

Baterna Annex. The University Baterna Annex in Constancia, San Lorenzo is now the host of the College of Agriculture and Fisheries, pursuant to its mandate as provided in RA 9138.

Location
The Guimaras State University is based in Buenavista, a town in Guimaras whose functional role is as center for higher education and agropolitan development. It lies about 4 miles (about 16 km) north-east of Jordan, the provincial capital of Guimaras. Most of the university's teaching activities take place at the Salvador Campus, which occupy a 5-hectare site with billowing trees in a sprawling park-like setting. A number of jeepneys and tricycles provide a public transport link between the university's central area throughout the year, both during and outside term times.

The province of Guimaras has a total land area of 60,457 hectares. The Province's specialization is on services sector (59%) particularly on other services which are both highest among the provinces in the region. Agriculture, fishery, and forestry sector ranks only second (8.76%). The industries that have the best potentials for contributing to the Province's economic growth are tourism, mango and cashew production, and food processing. Fishery including seaweed farming is considered as constrained performer which can best perform if supported. The province's annual per capita poverty threshold is pegged at Php 23,436 in 2017. There are 128 indigenous people's households, with a total population of 633 staying in the four identified areas in the four municipalities (excluding San Lorenzo), namely: Kati-Kati in San Miguel, Jordan; Serum in San Nicolas, Buenavista; Ubog in Lanipe Nueva Valencia; and Sitio Lininguan in Maabay, Sibunag.

All the five municipalities and most barangays within the province are accessible by land transport. Nevertheless, three island barangays can only be reached by pump boats. The various modes of transportation available within the province are jeepneys, tricycles, vans, and single motorcycles. Motorboats and sailboats are the means of transport to the island barangays. Communication technology is never a problem in the province. Electricity in the province is almost everywhere with 99.0% of the province's barangays benefiting from rural electrification. It is provided by electric cooperatives and private electric company which is in each of the five municipalities. The province's peace and order is managed by 39 policemen with a police to population ratio of one policeman for every 944 persons. Crime rate in October 2019 is at 3.59%. The Province listed 571,699 tourist arrival in 2017.

Logo

The university's logo is an important part of the graphic identity of the Guimaras State University. It is reserved for uses which promote the heritage and history of the university, such as degree certificates, invitations to formal University events, and sports team apparel and merchandise.

Inside the maroon gear is the name ‘Guimaras State University’in Akzidenz-Grotesk font in white text color; ‘Buenavista, Guimaras’ states its main campus's address—and the tower in tan-brown and the computer symbolize technology. The fire-red atom stands for science, which is one of the main thrusts of the university. The torch represents truth, divinity, liberty, freedom, justice, inspiration, enlightenment, leadership, and a dedication to education. The open book signifies education. The carabao's head projects the agricultural offerings while the fish projects the course offerings for the prospective, separate University's College of Fisheries. The two fronds of forest-green laurel forming an arch are the symbol of honor and integrity.

Board of Regents

REGENT J. PROSPERO E. DE VERA III
Commissioner, Commission on Higher Education
Chairperson

REGENT ROGELIO T. ARTAJO
SUC President III
Vice Chairperson

REGENT EMMANUEL JOEL JOSE VILLANUEVA
Chairman, Senate Committee on Higher, Technical and Vocational Education
Member

REGENT MARQUEZ “MARK” O. GO
Chairman, Committee on Higher Education and Technical Education of the House of Representatives
Member

REGENT RO-ANN A. BACAL
Regional Director
National Economic & Development Authority
Region VI-Western Visayas
Member

REGENT ROWEN R. GELONGA
Regional Director
Department of Science and Technology
Region VI-Western Visayas
Member

REGENT REMELYN R. RECOTER
Regional Director
Department of Agriculture
Region VI-Western Visayas
Resource Person

REGENT REBECCA C. TUBONGBANUA
Private Sector Representative
Member

REGENT VIZUR-TY C. GAITANO
President, Federated Alumni Association Inc.
Member

REGENT JONATHAN G. GABION
President, Federated Faculty Association
Member

REGENT ARNOLD G. RAFIL
President, Federated Student Republic
Member

Responsive Curricular Offerings (2020-2024)

The university offers degree programs which are relevant to the development needs of several sectors. Majority of its programs are in compliant to the minimum requirements of CHEd. Almost all programs are accredited by recognized accrediting agency. These accredited curricular program offerings will improve the chances of the institution to become center of excellence/development as well as the chance to bigger budget.

1. College of Teacher Education 
•Bachelor of Elementary - General Education
•Bachelor of Secondary Education 
majors in English, Filipino, Mathematics, and Social Studies
•Diploma in Teaching
•Special Education/Alternative Learning Education
•Technology and Livelihood Education (with various majors)

 2. College of Arts & Sciences (the service college of the university) 
•Bachelor of Arts in Economics 
•Bachelor of Arts in English
•Bachelor of Arts in Mass Communication 
•Bachelor of Arts in Political Science 
•Bachelor of Science in Biology
•Bachelor of Science in Chemistry 
•Bachelor of Science in Community Development 
•Bachelor of Science in Development Communication 
•Bachelor of Science in Mathematics
•Bachelor of Science in Psychology
•Bachelor of Science in Social Work

 3. College of Business Administration 
•Bachelor of Science in Accountancy 
•Bachelor of Science in Business Administration 
major in Financial Management, 
major in Marketing Management  
major in Human Resource Management
•Bachelor of Science in Customs Administration 
•Bachelor of Science in Entrepreneurship 
•Bachelor of Science in Office Administration
•Bachelor of Science in Real Estate Management

 4. College of Tourism and Hospitality Management 
•Bachelor of Arts in Aviation Tourism
•Bachelor of Science in Hospitality Management
•Bachelor of Science in Hospitality Management
•Bachelor of Science in Resort Operations Management
•Bachelor of Science in Services Technology [ladderized program]
•Bachelor of Science in Tourism Management
•Diploma in Hotel and Restaurant Services
•Stewarding

 5. College of Science and Technology 
•Bachelor of Science in Computer Science
•Bachelor of Science in Information Science
•Bachelor of Science in Information Technology
•Bachelor of Science in Food Technology
•Bachelor of Science in Food Packaging Technology
•Bachelor of Science in Library Science

 6. College of Engineering and Industrial Technology  
•Bachelor in Aircraft Maintenance
•Bachelor in Automotive Technology
•Bachelor in Aviation Engineering
•Bachelor in Electrical Technology
•Bachelor in Electronic Technology
•Bachelor in Machine Shop Technology
•Bachelor in Mechanical Technology
•Bachelor of Science in Civil Engineering 
•Bachelor of Science in Electrical Engineering
•Bachelor of Science in Electronics and Communication Engineering
•Bachelor of Science in Marine Engineering 
•Bachelor of Science in Marine Transportation 
•Bachelor of Science in Mechanical Engineering
•Bachelor of Science Industrial Engineering

 7. College of Criminal Justice Education  
•Bachelor of Forensic Science 
•Bachelor of Public Administration
•Bachelor of Science in Criminology
•Bachelor of Science in Industrial Security Management

 8. College of Agriculture and Fisheries (Baterna Annex) 
•Bachelor of Science in Agribusiness
•Bachelor of Science in Agricultural Engineering 
•Bachelor of Science in Agriculture 
majors in Animal Science and Crop Science 
•Bachelor of Science in Environmental Engineering
•Bachelor of Science in Fisheries 
•Bachelor of Science in Forestry

 9. College of Health Sciences 
•Bachelor of Science in Nursing
•Bachelor of Science in Midwifery
•Bachelor of Science in Pharmacy
•Healthcare Service

 10. Graduate School 
•Doctor of Philosophy (Ph.D.)
major in Educational Management
•Doctor of Education (Ed.D.)
major in Curriculum Instruction
•Doctor of Management (D.M.)
major in Business Management 
major in Human Resource Management
major in Public Management 
•Doctor of Philosophy 
major in Mathematics 
•Master of Arts in Education
majors in English, Filipino, General Science, Social Science, and Technology & Livelihood Education
•Master of Education (M.Ed.) (non-thesis)
major in Educational Management 
•Master of Art in Teaching (M.A.T.) 
major in Mathematics 
•Master of Public Administration (MPA)
•Master of Business Administration (MBA) thesis and non-thesis streams
•Master of Science in Agriculture 
•Master in Information Technology   
•Master of Science in Criminal Justice

Responsive Curricular Offerings (Stepping-Up Beyond 2022)

Bachelor of Arts in Advertising
Bachelor of Arts in Applied Communication & Culture Leadership
Bachelor of Arts in Creative & Professional Writing
Bachelor of Arts in Creative Business
Bachelor of Arts in Criminology & Psychology
Bachelor of Arts in Digital Business, Design & Innovation
Bachelor of Arts in English Language, Linguistics & TESOL
Bachelor of Arts in Entertainment Management
Bachelor of Arts in Government
Bachelor of Arts in Human Resource Management & Psychology
Bachelor of Arts in Industrial Relations
Bachelor of Arts in Marketing Communications & Public Relations
Bachelor of Arts in Sports Economics
Bachelor of Arts in Physical Education & Sports Management
Bachelor of Arts in Physical Education & Recreation Management
Bachelor of Arts in Planning & Public Policy
Bachelor of Arts in Political Economics
Bachelor of Arts in Rural Sociology
Bachelor of Arts in Sustainable Tourism Management
Bachelor of Arts in TESOL & Literature
Bachelor of Science in Agro-Ecology & Sustainable Agriculture
Bachelor of Science in Biotechnology
Bachelor of Science in Environmental & Material Science, Technology, and Management
Bachelor of Science in Fish Medicine
Bachelor of Science in Green Technology
Bachelor of Science in Microbiology & Immunology
Bachelor of Science in Marine Biology
Bachelor of Science in Taxation
Bachelor of Science in Wood Biology & Technology
Master of Arts in Teaching (Philippine History and Government)
Master of Arts in Teaching (ASEAN History and Government)
MBA in Business and Emerging Markets
MBA in Climate Change Management & Policy
MBA in Cybersecurity
MBA in Food and Agribusiness Management
MBA in Innovation & Entrepreneurship
MBA in Marketing & Revenue Generation
MBA in Sustainability
Master of Arts in Criminology & Psychology
Master of Arts in Government
Master of Arts in Human Resource Management & Psychology
Master of Arts in Industrial Relations
Master of Arts in Land Economy & Rural Surveying
Master of Arts in Planning & Public Policy
Master of Arts in Rural Sociology
Master of Arts in Social Innovation & Sustainability 
Master of Education
major in Extension Education 
major in Agricultural, Extension, & Adult Education
major in Instructional Leadership
Master of Nursing Practice
Master of Pharmacy
Master of Professional Studies in Renewable Energy & Sustainability Systems
Master of Professional Studies in Supply Chain Management
Master of Psychology 
Master of Science in Agricultural & Resource Economics
Master of Science in Business Intelligence & Analytics
Master of Science in Government Analytics
Master of Science in Green Technology
Master of Science in Taxation
Master of Science in Vocational Agriculture
Master of Studies in Sustainability Leadership 
MPA in Community & Regional Planning
MPA in Demography and Population
MPA in Cultural Industries Management
MPA in Employment and Labor Relations
MPA in Hospitality and Tourism Administration
MPA in Nonprofit Sector Management
MPA in Public Policy
MPA in Public Service Leadership
Post-Master's Certificate in Sustainability Strategies
Doctor of Management 
majors in Environmental & Social Sustainability and Social Impact Management
Doctor of Nursing Practice
Doctor of Pharmacy (PharmD)
Doctor of Psychology (PsyD)
majors in School Psychology and Marital & Family Therapy
Doctor of Science 
major in Emergency Management
EdD in Higher Education Administration
PhD in Child Development
PhD in Criminal Justice
PhD in Criminology & Psychology
PhD in Government
PhD in Green Technology
PhD in Human Resource Management & Psychology
PhD in Industrial Relations
PhD in Information Technology   
PhD in Planning and Public Policy
PhD in Rural Sociology

References

State universities and colleges in the Philippines
Universities and colleges in Guimaras